Lakemba was an electoral district of the Legislative Assembly in the Australian state of New South Wales, located in the South-Western suburbs of Sydney. It has been held by the Labor Party since its creation in 1927. It was represented by Morris Iemma, who was Premier of New South Wales from 3 August 2005 until his resignation on 5 September 2008. It has been held by Jihad Dib since the 2015 election.

Lakemba includes the suburbs of Chullora, Greenacre, Lakemba, Mount Lewis, Punchbowl, Wiley Park and parts of Bankstown, Belmore, Beverly Hills, Narwee, Riverwood and Roselands.

As a result of a redistribution in 2021, Lakemba was abolished at the 2023 election; its territory split between Bankstown, Canterbury and Oatley.

Members for Lakemba

Election results

References

Lakemba
1927 establishments in Australia
Lakemba